Helen Patricia Duncan  (7 November 1941 – 6 February 2007) was a New Zealand politician and a member of the Labour Party.

Early years
Duncan was born in Greymouth on the West Coast, and attended the University of Canterbury, the University of Auckland, and Christchurch Teachers' College. She worked as a teacher in a number of different cities including Lower Hutt, Masterton and Auckland. She was involved with the New Zealand Educational Institute (Te Riu Roa) and the New Zealand Council of Trade Unions.

Member of Parliament

In 1998 Jill White, a Labour list MP, resigned from Parliament. As Duncan was the next-ranked person on the Labour Party list, she entered Parliament in White's place.

She left Parliament at the  after being diagnosed with cancer. She died on 6 February 2007.

In the 2005 Queen's Birthday Honours, Duncan was appointed a Member of the New Zealand Order of Merit, for public services.

Notes

References

1941 births
2007 deaths
New Zealand Labour Party MPs
New Zealand educators
University of Canterbury alumni
University of Auckland alumni
Members of the New Zealand Order of Merit
People from Greymouth
Deaths from cancer in New Zealand
Women members of the New Zealand House of Representatives
New Zealand list MPs
Unsuccessful candidates in the 1996 New Zealand general election
Members of the New Zealand House of Representatives
21st-century New Zealand politicians
21st-century New Zealand women politicians
20th-century New Zealand women politicians
20th-century New Zealand politicians
New Zealand trade unionists
People educated at Greymouth High School